Abu Jadan Mirza Avaz (also Romanized as Ābū Jadān Mīrzā ʿAvaz̤) is a village in Sadat Rural District, in the Central District of Lali County, Khuzestan Province, Iran. At the 2006 census, its population was 137, in 25 families.

References 

Populated places in Lali County